Chaikin Analytics (formerly Chaikin Stock Research) is a platform for stock trading ideas. It was founded in 2011 by Marc Chaikin. The centerpiece of Chaikin Analytics is the Chaikin Power Gauge stock rating. In 2016, it was named one of "Two Top Websites for Quantitative Analysis" by Barron's (newspaper).

The Chaikin Power Gauge Rating
The Chaikin Power Gauge Rating is a tri-color stock rating system that indicates the investment potential of a stock: red shows that a stock is bearish, yellow that it has a neutral rating, and green that it is bullish. The rating system accounts for over 20 different metrics and organizes these into four distinct categories: financial metrics, earnings performance, price-volume activity, and expert opinions. The system has been back-tested on 10 years of data.

In April 2014, Chaikin collaborated with Nasdaq to overlay the Chaikin Power Gauge stock rating on three popular Nasdaq stock indexes: Large Cap, Small Cap, and Dividend Achievers.

In 2017, Chaikin Analytics launched a collaboration with Nasdaq and IndexIQ to bring the Chaikin Power Gauge stock rating approach to the ETF marketplace for the first time.

Chaikin Indicators

Chaikin Oscillator
The Chaikin Oscillator was developed in the 1970s. The indicator is based upon the momentum of the Accumulation/Distribution (AD). AD calculates the position of a stock's daily closing price as a fraction of the daily price range of the stock—a fraction that is multiplied by the daily volume in order to quantify the net accumulation or distribution of a stock. AD is expressed mathematically as:

or

where "AD" represents the Accumulation/Distribution cumulative total running line, "cum" is an instructive abbreviation meaning "calculate a cumulative total running line", "C" is the daily closing price, "H" is the daily high price, "L" is the daily low price, and "V" is the daily total volume.

The indicator is measured as the difference between the 3-day exponential moving average (EMA) of the AD to the 10-day EMA of the AD.  It signals   when crossing above or below the zero line or when bullish/bearish departures take place. These signals anticipate the change in direction of the AD.  Stock analysts   observe a Chaikin Oscillator graph to look for the signal to buy or sell a stock.

Chaikin Money Flow
Chaikin Money Flow (also referred to as CMF) is one of the metrics taken into account by the Chaikin Power Gauging System. CMF tracks cash flow volumes over a fixed period, usually around 20 days. The indicator oscillates above and below the zero line which indicates a bullish or bearish trend. The indicator is also used to calculate Chaikin’s Accumulation/Distribution (AD).

Chaikin Money Flow is derived from foundational trading principles; gauging buying support and/or selling pressure. Buying support is typically indicated by increased trade volume and repeated closes in the top half of the daily range, while selling pressure is indicated by increased trade volume and recurrent closes in the lower half of the daily range. Rising prices often accompany buying support and decreasing prices usually characterize selling pressure. The result provides insight into cash flow into or out of a stock.

To determine the CMF one must first determine the Close Location Value (CLV) as follows:

 
or 

The next step is to take the CLV and determine the CMF, as follows:

References

Companies based in Philadelphia